The Two Foscari is an oil on canvas painting by Eugène Delacroix, executed in 1855, now in the Musée Condé in Chantilly.

1855 paintings
History paintings
Paintings by Eugène Delacroix
Paintings in the collection of the Musée Condé